Capellanus (chaplain) may refer to 12/13th century figures:

 Andreas Capellanus (also known as Andrew the Chaplain or André le Chapelain), 12th-century author of a treatise commonly known as De amore ("About Love")
 Walter Capellanus of St Albans, bishop of Glasgow, An important cleric and politician in the Kingdom of Scotland during the reigns of kings William the Lion and Alexander II
 Robert Capellanus (also known as Robert the Chaplain; d. c. 1249), chaplain of King William I of Scotland and afterwards, Bishop of Ross (1214–1249)
 John Capellanus (died 1147), early 12th-century Tironensian cleric. He was the chaplain and close confidant of king David I of Scotland before becoming Bishop of Glasgow and founder of Glasgow Cathedral. He was one of the most significant religious reformers in the history of Scotland